Vales Mills is an unincorporated community in Vinton County, in the U.S. state of Ohio.

History
The community took its name from Vale's Mill, a sawmill and gristmill. A post office was established at Vales Mills in 1878, and remained in operation until 1938. Arthur P. Vale was the first postmaster.

References

Unincorporated communities in Vinton County, Ohio
Unincorporated communities in Ohio